Nandlal Choudhary (born 14 October 1933) is an Indian politician from the Indian National Congress(I) party. He is a Member of the 8th Lok sabha of India. He was also elected for Member of Legislative Assembly in 1962 from Khurai (Sagar).

References

India MPs 1984–1989
Lok Sabha members from Madhya Pradesh
People from Sagar district
1933 births
Living people
Indian National Congress politicians